Derekh eretz or derech eretz (Hebrew: דרך ארץ, literally "the way of the land") is the term used for "proper behaviour".

Derekh Eretz may refer to:
 Derekh Eretz Rabbah, one of the minor tractates of the Talmud
 Derekh Eretz Zutta, one of the minor tractates of the Talmud
 Torah im Derech Eretz, a philosophy of Orthodox Judaism
 Derekh Eretz (political faction), a political faction

See also
 Proper behavior precedes the Torah, a saying found in Midrash Rabba